The United States Court of Appeals for the District of Columbia Circuit (in case citations, D.C. Cir.) is one of the thirteen United States Courts of Appeals. It has the smallest geographical jurisdiction of any of the U.S. federal appellate courts, and covers only one district court: the U.S. District Court for the District of Columbia. It meets at the E. Barrett Prettyman United States Courthouse, near Judiciary Square, Washington, D.C.

The D.C. Circuit's prominence and prestige among American federal courts is second only to the U.S. Supreme Court because its geographic jurisdiction contains the U.S. Capitol and the headquarters of many of the U.S. federal government's executive departments and government agencies, and therefore it is the main federal appellate court for many issues of American administrative law and constitutional law.  Four of the current nine justices on the Supreme Court were previously judges on the D.C. Circuit including Chief Justice John Roberts, along with associate justices Clarence Thomas, Brett Kavanaugh and Ketanji Brown Jackson. Former justices Fred M. Vinson, Wiley Blount Rutledge, Warren E. Burger, Antonin Scalia, and Ruth Bader Ginsburg, also served as judges on the D.C. Circuit before their appointments to the Supreme Court.

Because the D.C. Circuit does not represent any state, confirmation of nominees can be procedurally and practically easier than for nominees to the Courts of Appeals for the other geographical districts, as home-state senators have historically been able to hold up confirmation through the "blue slip" process. However, in recent years, several nominees to the D.C. Circuit were stalled, and some were ultimately not confirmed because senators claimed that the court had become larger than necessary to handle its caseload.

Current composition of the court 
:

Vacancies and pending nominations

List of former judges

Chiefs 

When Congress established this court in 1893 as the Court of Appeals of the District of Columbia, it had a chief justice, and the other judges were called associate justices, which was similar to the structure of the Supreme Court. The chief justiceship was a separate seat: the president would appoint the chief justice, and that person would stay chief justice until he left the court.

On June 25, 1948, 62 Stat. 869 and 62 Stat. 985 became law. These acts made the chief justice a chief judge. In 1954, another law, 68 Stat. 1245, clarified what was implicit in those laws: that the chief judgeship was not a mere renaming of the position but a change in its status that made it the same as the chief judge of other inferior courts.

Succession of seats 

The court has eleven seats for active judges after the elimination of Seat 8 under the Court Security Improvement Act of 2007. The seat that was originally the chief justiceship is numbered as Seat 1; the other seats are numbered in order of their creation. If seats were established simultaneously, they are numbered in the order in which they were filled. Judges who retire into senior status remain on the bench but leave their seat vacant. That seat is filled by the next circuit judge appointed by the president.

See also 
 Judicial appointment history for United States federal courts#DC Circuit
 List of current United States Circuit Judges

Notes

References 

 
 Source for the duty station for Judge Williams
 
 Source for the duty station for Judges Silberman and Buckley
 Data is current to 2002
 
 Source for the state, lifetime, term of active judgeship, term of chief judgeship, term of senior judgeship, appointer, termination reason, and seat information

External links 

 United States Court of Appeals for the District of Columbia Circuit
 Recent opinions from FindLaw
 What Makes the DC Circuit so Different? A Historical View - Article by Chief Justice John G. Roberts, Jr.
 

 
Government in Washington, D.C.

1893 establishments in Washington, D.C.
Courts and tribunals established in 1893